Mickaël Cériélo (born 1 September 1984) is a French professional footballer who currently plays as a defender for Championnat National 3 side Villefranche Saint-Jean Beaulieu FC.

References
 
 Mickaël Cériélo profile at foot-national.com
 

1984 births
Living people
Association football defenders
French footballers
Ligue 2 players
Championnat National players
Championnat National 2 players
Championnat National 3 players
AS Cannes players
CS Sedan Ardennes players
LB Châteauroux players
Red Star F.C. players